Rajab Hamza Qassim (born 16 October 1986) is a Qatari footballer who plays as a goalkeeper for Al-Shahania and the Qatar national team.

Honours

Club
Al-Arabi
Sheikh Jassem Cup (2): 2008, 2010, 2011

References

1986 births
Living people
Tanzanian emigrants to Qatar
Naturalised citizens of Qatar
Qatari people of Tanzanian descent
Zanzibari footballers
Tanzanian footballers
Qatari footballers
Qatar international footballers
2007 AFC Asian Cup players
Al-Markhiya SC players
Al Ahli SC (Doha) players
Al-Arabi SC (Qatar) players
Qatar SC players
Al-Khor SC players
Al-Shahania SC players
Qatari Second Division players
Qatar Stars League players
Association football goalkeepers